Below is list of Afrikaans exonyms:

Australia

Austria

Belgium

Canada

China

Czech Republic

Denmark

Egypt

France

Germany

Greece

India

Indonesia

Israel

Italy

Japan

Lebanon

Mexico

Morocco

New Zealand

North Korea

Palestine

Poland

Portugal

Romania

Russia

Serbia

South Korea

Spain

Sweden

Syria

Turkey

Ukraine

United Kingdom

United States

See also 
Dutch exonyms

Afrikaans
Lists of exonyms